All American in Jazz is an album by American pianist, composer and bandleader Duke Ellington recorded in 1962 and released on the Columbia label. The album features recordings of tunes from the 1962 Broadway theatre musical All American arranged by Ellington and Billy Strayhorn.

Track listing
All compositions by Charles Strouse and Lee Adams.
 "Back to School" – 2:48
 "I've Just Seen Her" – 4:32
 "Which Way?" – 2:20
 "If I Were You" – 2:56
 "Once Upon a Time" – 3:20
 "Nightlife" – 2:18
 "Our Children" – 3:10
 "I Couldn't Have Done It Alone" – 2:22
 "We Speak the Same Language" – 2:51
 "What a Country!" – 3:00

Personnel
Duke Ellington (tracks 2-8 & 10), Billy Strayhorn (tracks 1, 3, 6 & 9) – piano
Ray Nance – cornet 
Cat Anderson, Shorty Baker, Bill Berry, Ed Mullens - trumpet
Lawrence Brown, Lyle Cox - trombone
Chuck Connors - bass trombone
Jimmy Hamilton - clarinet, tenor saxophone
Johnny Hodges - alto saxophone
Russell Procope - alto saxophone, clarinet
Paul Gonsalves - tenor saxophone
Harry Carney - baritone saxophone
Aaron Bell - bass 
Sam Woodyard - drums

References

Columbia Records albums
Duke Ellington albums
1962 albums
Albums produced by Teo Macero